Mounds is a town in Creek County, Oklahoma, United States. It is located just south of Tulsa; the town's population was 1,168 at the 2010 census, an increase of 1.3 percent from the figure of 1,153 recorded in 2000.

History
The post office for this community was established in 1895 and originally named "Posey", for the Creek poet Alexander Posey, who lived in Eufaula, Oklahoma. By 1901, the St. Louis, Oklahoma and Southern Railway (later the St. Louis and San Francisco Railway) built a track through Mounds, and the town became an important cattle shipping point. Mounds incorporated as a city in the same year. The discovery of oil in the Glenn Pool field in 1905 turned Mounds into a shipping point for crude oil instead of cattle.

In the early days, Mounds was on the route of the Sapulpa & Interurban Railway (“S&I”) streetcar/interurban line connecting to Tulsa through Sapulpa, Kiefer and Glenpool; S&I subsequently went through a series of mergers and name changes, with only the Tulsa-to-Sapulpa portion continuing as the Tulsa-Sapulpa Union Railway.

Mounds had a population of 675 at statehood in 1907, rising to 701 in 1910. The oil boom played out in the 1920s, and the population declined from 1,078 in 1920 to 701 in 1930. Railroad activity became primarily shipping grain and cattle. As time went by, the population reached a low of 560 in 1950, since which it has increased. In the 21st century, Mounds is mostly a commuter town, with 92 percent of employed residents commuting to work primarily in Sapulpa and Tulsa.

Geography
U.S. Route 75A passes through the center of town, leading north  to Kiefer and south  to Beggs.

Demographics

As of the census of 2000, there were 1,153 people, 449 households, and 312 families residing in the town. There were 500 housing units at an average density of 427.9 per square mile (165.0/km2). The racial makeup of the town was 76.06% White, 1.21% African American, 15.61% Native American, 0.09% Asian, 1.21% from other races, and 5.81% from two or more races. Hispanic or Latino of any race were 1.82% of the population.

There were 449 households, out of which 34.1% had children under the age of 18 living with them, 50.6% were married couples living together, 12.2% had a female householder with no husband present, and 30.5% were non-families. 28.3% of all households were made up of individuals, and 15.4% had someone living alone who was 65 years of age or older. The average household size was 2.57 and the average family size was 3.10.

In the town, the population was spread out, with 29.3% under the age of 18, 9.1% from 18 to 24, 25.0% from 25 to 44, 22.4% from 45 to 64, and 14.2% who were 65 years of age or older. The median age was 35 years. For every 100 females, there were 93.5 males. For every 100 females age 18 and over, there were 92.2 males.

The median income for a household in the town was $27,050, and the median income for a family was $35,417. Males had a median income of $28,438 versus $18,750 for females. The per capita income for the town was $12,917. About 10.2% of families and 15.7% of the population were below the poverty line, including 17.5% of those under age 18 and 22.3% of those age 65 or over.

Education
Enrollment in the Mounds public school district serves about 300 pupils. The district's overall student/teacher ratio is 14.5:1. There are 2 schools associated with the agency, which is classified as being in or near a rural area. Mounds allocates approximately $2,854 per pupil for instructional expenses.

Mounds is the site of the ACT Observatory, a small astronomical observatory maintained by the Astronomy Club of Tulsa.

Liberty Mounds
There is no town of Liberty Mounds, despite the signs on US Route 75 pointing to Mounds on the west of the highway, and “Liberty Mounds” east of it.  The town of Liberty, Oklahoma was originally incorporated in 1978 by the Spradling family precisely to avoid annexation of the area by other communities, including Mounds.  The name was taken from the nearby Liberty School District, which a former school superintendent called “Liberty Mounds” to distinguish it from another Liberty school district near Morris in Okmulgee County.  So the sign references the school, although both the town and the school district are actually named Liberty.

Notable people
 Thomas Gilcrease (1890-1962), Oklahoma oilman, philanthropist, founder of Gilcrease Museum in Tulsa lived in Mounds during boyhood
 George E. R. Kinnear II (1928–2015), four star admiral in the United States Navy
 Reuben Wilson (born 1935), jazz organist

References

Towns in Creek County, Oklahoma
Tulsa metropolitan area
Towns in Oklahoma